ATCO Ltd., operating as the ATCO Group, is a publicly-traded Canadian engineering, logistics and energy holding company based in Calgary, Alberta. ATCO's subsidiaries include electric utilities, natural gas production and distribution companies, and construction companies.

ATCO focuses on the energy transition front, notably on the hydrogen front.

Subsidiaries 
The ATCO Group of Companies includes the following subsidiaries:

Canadian Utilities, with its subsidiaries:

 CU Inc., which in turn owns:
 ATCO Electric (delivers electricity in Alberta, Yukon (as ATCO Electric Yukon), and the Northwest Territories (as Northland Utilities)
 ATCO Gas (delivers natural gas in Alberta)
 ATCO Pipelines (transports natural gas throughout Alberta)
 ATCO Australia - Established in 2010. 'In July 2011, ATCO purchased the largest reticulated gas infrastructure in Western Australia through the acquisition of Western Australia Gas Networks. The $1.1 billion AUD purchase of what is now called ATCO Gas Australia, is one of the largest acquisitions in ATCO's history. ATCO Gas Australia is a gas distribution utility that serves the Perth metropolitan area and major towns and cities throughout the state of Western Australia. Its combined networks constitute approximately 13,100 km of natural gas pipelines connecting more than 650,000 customers ... ATCO Australia also includes ATCO Power Australia, which has three power stations operating in Brisbane, Adelaide and Karratha. In January 2011, these plants were transferred from ATCO Power, based in Calgary, Alberta, Canada, which operates 15 power generating facilities in Canada and the United Kingdom. While not part of ATCO Australia, ATCO Structures & Logistics is an important part of ATCO's Australian operations with three manufacturing facilities and five office locations in the country.'
 ATCO Energy Solutions (natural gas processing and storage)
 ATCO Power (electricity generation)
ATCOenergy (natural gas and electricity retailing)
 ATCO Mexico - Established in 2014. (natural gas, electricity, power generation and structure and logistics)

ATCO Structures & Logistics (manufactures, leases, and sells modular buildings; created by the merger of ATCO Structures, ATCO Noise Management and ATCO Frontec)

ATCO Sustainable Communities (sustainable infrastructure for remote and Aboriginal communities)

History 
ATCO was founded in 1947, by S. Don Southern who gave a minority stake to his son Ron Southern, under the name Alberta Trailer Hire, renting fifteen utility trailers in the Calgary area.  As the company's operations grew, they also began to sell trailers, first becoming the Alberta Trailer Company, then ATCO. By the early 1960s, the company had operations across North America and in Australia.

ATCO Industries Ltd. became a public company in March 1968, with shares traded on the Toronto Stock Exchange. During the 1970s, the company expanded into the natural gas and petroleum industries, and into the electricity industry in the 1980s.

In 2004, with the deregulation of the retail energy industry in Alberta, ATCO sold the retail operations of ATCO Gas and ATCO Electric to  Direct Energy Marketing Ltd. (DEML) while ATCO Gas and ATCO Electric still operated as "distributors" (owning and operating the infrastructure that delivers natural gas or electricity in its service territories). As part of the sale to DEML, DEML contracted call center and billing services from ATCO I-Tek. In 2016, ATCO re-entered the retail energy industry in Alberta as ATCOenergy.

In 2018, ATCO acquired 40% of the shares in Neltume Ports, a South American port terminal operator.

In 2022, ATCO agreed to pay a fine after overcharging for work on a new transmission line.

References

External links 
 
 
 

 
Holding companies of Canada
Electric power companies of Canada
Natural gas companies of Canada
Electric power companies of Australia
Companies based in Calgary
Energy companies established in 1947
Non-renewable resource companies established in 1947
1947 establishments in Alberta
Companies listed on the Toronto Stock Exchange